Massari is the self-titled debut album by Lebanese/Canadian artist Massari released on May 31, 2005, under the label CP Records. It was co-written and co-produced by both rapper Belly and Massari and other producers included on the album are DaHeala and Lynx. The album features the hit tracks "Smile for Me" (featuring Loon), "Be Easy", " "Real Love", and "Rush the Floor" (featuring Belly). Since its release the album was certified Gold by Music Canada with over 50,000 copies sold across Canada.

Track listing
All songs written and composed by S. Abboud, except where noted.

Personnel
Adapted from the Massari liner notes.
Executive Producer: Tony Sal
Director of Operations: A. Balshe
Vocal Arrangement: Lynx
Art Design: Chris McJannet
Photography: M. Govindji
Graphics: C. Lavergne

References

2005 debut albums
Massari albums
CP Music Group albums